Adaran or Aderan may refer to:
 Adaran, Alborz
 Adaran, Tehran
 Adaran Rural District, in Alborz Province
 Ādarān (or Ātash Ādarān), a grade of Zoroastrian holy fire